Kalleh Mar or Kaleh Mar or Kallehmar may refer to:
 Kalleh Mar-e Olya
 Kalleh Mar-e Pain